Bolshov or Bolşov is a Slavic masculine surname, its feminine counterpart is Bolshova or Bolşova. It may refer to:
Ekaterina Bolshova (born 1988), Russian heptathlete
Olga Bolşova (born 1968), Moldovan athlete
Viktor Bolshov (born 1939), Russian high jumper

Russian-language surnames